James George Cowmeadow (7 July 1887 – 6 December 1964) was a rugby union and professional rugby league footballer who played in the 1900s. In 1910 he signed for York RFC.

International honours
Cowmeadow represented Welsh League XIII while at Merthyr Tydfil. He played , i.e. number 5, in the 14-13 victory over Australia at Penydarren Park, Merthyr Tydfil on Tuesday 19 January 1909, scoring two tries.

References

External links
Search for "Cowmeadow" at espn.co.uk (RU)
Search for "J. Cowmeadow" at britishnewspaperarchive.co.uk
Search for "Cowmeadow" at britishnewspaperarchive.co.uk

1887 births
1964 deaths
Cinderford R.F.C. players
English rugby league players
English rugby union players
Gloucestershire County RFU players
Merthyr Tydfil RLFC players
Rugby league players from Gloucestershire
Rugby league wingers
Rugby union players from Westbury-on-Severn
Welsh League rugby league team players